The 1893 Central Colonels football team represented Central University in Richmond, Kentucky during the 1893 college football season.

Schedule

References

Central
Eastern Kentucky Colonels football seasons
College football undefeated seasons
Central Colonels football